Claudia Pop (born 10 July 1968, Brasov, Transylvania) is a Romanian soprano, opera stage director, and Senior Lecturer at Transylvania University in Braşov.

In 2009, she was a soloist in a staging of St Matthew Passion by J. S. Bach with the George Enescu Bucharest Philharmonic Orchestra.  In 2010, she was a soloist at the International Festival of Lyrical Art. Also in 2010, in honor of Papa Giovanni Paolo II, she was the soloist interpreting the premiere of the requiem "Sei grande Karol" by P. Carlo Colafranceschi, accompanied by the orchestration of Ezio Monti with the Rome Philharmonic Orchestra.
She was also the soloist in various editions of the Brasov Musica Coronensis Festival, interpreting with the Brasov Philharmonic Orchestra the Requiem by W. A. Mozart, pieces by Gabriel Fauré, the "Marea Missa in re minor" by Anton Bruckner, the St Matthew Passion oratorio by J. S. Bach, among others.

Musical training
Pop graduated with a mechanical engineering degree at Transylvania University in Brașov (1986–1991). She studied canto with Georgeta Stoleriu at the Music Academy in Bucharest (1991–1996) and with Arta Florescu (1995–1998). She graduated with qualifications for opera stage directorship (1993–1998) and then with a Ph. Dottor in Stylistic of Music degree (1999–2003) from the National University of Music Bucharest.

Work
1996–1998 – soloist at Opera Brașov, Romania
1998–1999 – opera stage director at Opera Constanta and the E. Teodorini Musical Theater Galati, Romania
2000–2012 – university assistant, lecturer and senior lecturer at Transylvania University, Brasov, Romania

Recordings
CD- EDC 916 "Chemin d'amour" Poulenc, Debussy, Ravel, Fauré (Electrecord Romania, 2009).

Repertoire
 Die Zauberflöte by W. A.Mozart
 Le nozze di Figaro by W. A. Mozart
 Suor Angelica by G. Puccini
 La Bohème by G. Puccini
 Die Fledermaus by J. Strauss
 Wiener Blut by J. Strauss
 St Matthew Passion, St John Passion by J. S. Bach
 Magnificat by J. S. Bach
 Cantata No. 11 by J. S. Bach
 Die sieben Worte Jesu Christi am Kreuz by H. Schütz
 Dixit Dominus by G. F. Handel
 Messiah by G. F. Handel
 Die Schöpfung by J. Haydn
 Requiem by W. A. Mozart, Fauré
 Mass in D minor by A. Bruckner
 Petite Messe Solennelle by G. Rossini
 Psalm 42 by F. Mendelssohn
 Peer Gynt by E. Grieg
 Messe in A by G. Fauré

References 

1968 births
Living people
People from Brașov
Romanian operatic sopranos